The mass media in Honduras consist of several different types of communications media: television, radio, cinema, newspapers, magazines, and Internet-based websites. Honduras also has a growing music industry.

Radio 

Currently, in Honduras there are more than 800 active operators in the FM frequencies, and more than 200 active operators in the AM band. The predominant musical genres on the main radio stations are: rancheras and mexican music (Musiquera), hip hop / urban (Radioactiva), news and talk (Radio Globo) and oldies (Estéreo Clase).

Television 

At least half of Honduran households have at least one television. Public television has a far smaller role than in most other countries.

Motion pictures

Honduras has a growing industry that started in the 1950s.

The Mosquito Coast is an American drama about life in Honduras. El Espíritu de mi Mamá is a story of a young woman's journey back to Honduras to discover her roots.

Morazán is a 2017 Honduran drama film. It was selected as the Honduran entry for the Best Foreign Language Film at the 90th Academy Awards, but it was not nominated. It was the first time Honduras had sent a film for consideration for the Best Foreign Language film.

Music
There is a wiki page for music:
A smithsonian collection of folk songs from Honduras is given here:

Print media

Newspapers

All major metropolitan areas have their own local newspapers, for example the Newspapers in San Pedro Sula and Tegucigalpa.

Magazines 

Honduras has various monthly newsmagazines, including Hablemos Claro, Cromos, Diez, Click, Estilo, Amiga, and Hablemos Claro Financiera.

There are also specialized magazines that serve the diverse interests and hobbies of the Honduran people, there are also some magazines published by professional organizations for their members, such as Revista Medica Hondureña.

Internet 

The Internet has provided a means for newspapers and other media organizations to deliver news and the means to look up old news. Some organizations allow their archives to be freely browsed.

See also

 Telecommunications in Honduras

References

 
Honduras
Honduras